Steve Peterson is an American game designer who has worked primarily on role-playing games.

Career
When George MacDonald started work on role-playing games by adding more detailed super powers to Gamescience's Superhero: 2044 RPG and ultimately creating his own original system, Steve Peterson typed the game up, which eventually became the superhero RPG, Champions (1981). MacDonald and Peterson had only enough money to print 1,500 copies of the game and hand-collated the pages, and they sold their new game at Pacific Origins 1981; they were surprised to see it sell very well, selling 1,000 of their 1,500 copies at the convention. After this early success, MacDonald and Peterson started Hero Games as a publishing label. By 1982 MacDonald and Peterson opened up an office and asked player Ray Greer to join them as a partner and to handle marketing and sales. MacDonald and Peterson designed the game Espionage! (1983), which was later updated with L. Douglas Garrett as Danger International (1985).

By 1986, Peterson was working at Electronic Arts. Peterson later formed a new company, Hero Software, which licensed Champions rights from Hero Games. In 1990, Peterson gathered together a group of four designers and programmers as well as a few long-time Hero artists, as well as Hero founder Ray Greer to create a Champions computer game, but the project was never completed. Peterson was involved, with Ray Greer and Bruce Harlick, in the Hero Games partnership with R. Talsorian Games that began in 1996. Mike Pondsmith of R. Talsorian, and Hero Games owners Peterson and Greer built conversion rules to connect up Interlock and Hero Games, resulting in the Fuzion system. When Cybergames.com acquired Hero Games in 2000, Peterson was hired on as Vice President of Marketing and Product Development.

References

External links
 

Living people
Role-playing game designers
Year of birth missing (living people)